The 2nd United States Congress, consisting of the United States Senate and the United States House of Representatives, met at Congress Hall in Philadelphia, Pennsylvania, from March 4, 1791, to March 4, 1793, during the third and fourth years of George Washington's presidency. The apportionment of seats in the House of Representatives was based on the provisions of  Article I, Section 2, Clause 3 of the United States Constitution. Additional House seats were assigned to the two new states of Vermont and Kentucky. Both chambers had a Pro-Administration majority.

Major events

April 5, 1792: President Washington used the veto for the first time, vetoing a bill designed to apportion representatives among U.S. states.
April–May, 1792: the House conducted the government's first investigative hearings, examining Gen. Arthur St. Clair's Defeat in the Battle of the Wabash.
October 13, 1792: Foundation of Washington, D.C.: The cornerstone of the United States Executive Mansion, now known as the White House, was laid.

Major legislation

 February 20, 1792: Postal Service Act, Sess. 1, ch. 7, established the U.S. Post Office
 March 1, 1792: Act relative to the Election of a President and Vice President of the United States, and to Presidential Succession, Sess. 1, ch. 8, stated the process for electors and Congress to follow when electing a president and vice president, and established which federal officer would act as president if both the offices of president and vice president became vacant.
 April 2, 1792: Coinage Act of 1792, Sess. 1, ch. 16, established the United States Mint and regulated coinage
 April 14, 1792: Apportionment Act of 1792, Sess. 1, ch. 23 , increased the size of the House of Representatives from 69 seats in the 2nd Congress to 105 in the 3rd and apportioned those seats among the several states according to the 1790 census
 May 2, 1792: First Militia Act of 1792, Sess. 1, ch. 28, empowered the president to call out the militias of the various states in the event of an invasion or rebellion.
 May 5, 1792: Debtors' Prison Relief Act of 1792, Sess. 1, ch. 29, established penal regulations and restrictions for persons' gaoled for property debt, tax evasion, and tax resistance.
 May 8, 1792: Second Militia Act of 1792, Sess. 1, ch. 33, required that every free able-bodied white male citizen of the various states, between the ages of 18 and 45, enroll in the militia of the state in which they reside.
 February 12, 1793: Fugitive Slave Act of 1793, Sess. 2, ch. 7, 
 March 2, 1793: Judiciary Act of 1793 (including Anti-Injunction Act), Sess. 2, ch. 22,

States admitted
 March 4, 1791: Vermont was admitted as the 14th state, 
 June 1, 1792: Kentucky was admitted as the 15th state,

Constitutional amendments 
 December 15, 1791: The first 10 amendments to the United States Constitution, collectively known as the Bill of Rights, were ratified by the requisite number of states (then 11) to become part of the Constitution.

Party summary
There were no political parties in this Congress. Members are informally grouped into factions of similar interest, based on an analysis of their voting record.

Details on changes are shown below in the "Changes in membership" section.

Senate
During this congress, two new Senate seats were added for each of the new states of Vermont and Kentucky.

House of Representatives

During this congress, two new House seats were added for each of the new states of Vermont and Kentucky. (Sess. 3, ch. 9)

Leadership

Senate
President: John Adams (P)
President pro tempore:
 Richard Henry Lee (P)
 John Langdon (P), elected November 5, 1792

House of Representatives
Speaker: Jonathan Trumbull Jr. (P)

Members
This list is arranged by chamber, then by state. Senators are listed by class, and representatives are listed by district.

Senate
Senators were elected by the state legislatures every two years, with one-third beginning new six-year terms with each Congress. Preceding the names in the list below are Senate class numbers, which indicate the cycle of their election. In this Congress, Class 1 meant their term began in this Congress, facing re-election in 1796; Class 2 meant their term ended with this Congress, facing re-election in 1792; and Class 3 meant their term began in the last Congress, facing re-election in 1794.

Connecticut 
 1. Oliver Ellsworth (P)
 3. William S. Johnson (P), until March 4, 1791
 Roger Sherman (P), from June 13, 1791

Delaware 
 1. George Read (P)
 2. Richard Bassett (P)

Georgia 
 2. William Few (A)
 3. James Gunn (A)

Kentucky 
 2. John Brown (A), from June 18, 1792
 3. John Edwards (A), from June 18, 1792

Maryland 
 1. Charles Carroll (P), until November 30, 1792
 Richard Potts (P), from February 4, 1793
 3. John Henry (P)

Massachusetts 
 1. George Cabot (P)
 2. Caleb Strong (P)

New Hampshire 
 2. Paine Wingate (A)
 3. John Langdon (P)

New Jersey 
 1. John Rutherfurd (P)
 2. Philemon Dickinson (P)

New York 
 1. Aaron Burr (A)
 3. Rufus King (P)

North Carolina 
 2. Samuel Johnston (P)
 3. Benjamin Hawkins (P)

Pennsylvania 
 1. Albert Gallatin (A), from February 28, 1793 (not formally installed until next Congress)
 3. Robert Morris (P)

Rhode Island 
 1. Theodore Foster (P)
 2. Joseph Stanton Jr. (A)

South Carolina 
 2. Pierce Butler (A)
 3. Ralph Izard (P)

Vermont 
 1. Moses Robinson (A), from October 17, 1791
 3. Stephen R. Bradley (A), from October 17, 1791

Virginia 
 2. Richard Henry Lee (A), until October 8, 1792
 John Taylor (A), from December 12, 1792
 1. James Monroe (A)

House of Representatives
The names of members of the House of Representatives are preceded by their districts.

Connecticut 
All representatives were elected statewide on a general ticket.
 . James Hillhouse (P)
 . Amasa Learned (P)
 . Jonathan Sturges (P)
 . Jonathan Trumbull Jr. (P)
 . Jeremiah Wadsworth (P)

Delaware 
 . John Vining (P)

Georgia 
All representatives were elected statewide from individual districts.
 . Anthony Wayne (A), until March 21, 1792 (seat declared vacant)
 John Milledge (A), from November 22, 1792
 . Abraham Baldwin (A)
 . Francis Willis (A)

Kentucky 
 . Christopher Greenup (A), from November 9, 1792
 . Alexander D. Orr (A), from November 8, 1792

Maryland 
All representatives were elected statewide from individual districts.
 . Philip Key (P)
 . Joshua Seney (A), until December 6, 1792
 William Hindman (P), from January 30, 1793
 . William Pinkney (P), until November 9, 1791
 John F. Mercer (A), from February 6, 1792
 . Samuel Sterett (A)
 . William Vans Murray (P)
 . Upton Sheredine (A)

Massachusetts 
 . Fisher Ames (P)
 . Benjamin Goodhue (P)
 . Elbridge Gerry (A)
 . Theodore Sedgwick (P)
 . Shearjashub Bourne (P)
 . George Leonard (P), from April 2, 1792 (late election)
 . Artemas Ward (P)
 . George Thatcher (P), from April 4, 1791 (late election)

New Hampshire 
All representatives were elected statewide on a general ticket.
 . Nicholas Gilman (P)
 . Samuel Livermore (P)
 . Jeremiah Smith (P)

New Jersey 
All representatives were elected statewide on a general ticket.
 . Elias Boudinot (P)
 . Abraham Clark (P)
 . Jonathan Dayton (P)
 . Aaron Kitchell (A)

New York 
 . Thomas Tredwell (A), from October 24, 1791
 . John Laurance (P)
 . Egbert Benson (P)
 . Cornelius C. Schoonmaker (A)
 . Peter Silvester (P)
 . James Gordon (P)

North Carolina 
There was a special redistricting for this Congress.
 . John Steele (P)
 . Nathaniel Macon (A)
 . John Baptista Ashe (A)
 . Hugh Williamson (A)
 . William Barry Grove (P)

Pennsylvania 
 . Thomas Fitzsimons (P)
 . Frederick Muhlenberg (A)
 . Israel Jacobs (P)
 . Daniel Hiester (A)
 . John W. Kittera (P)
 . Andrew Gregg (A)
 . Thomas Hartley (P)
 . William Findley (A)

Rhode Island 
 . Benjamin Bourne (P)

South Carolina 
 . William L. Smith (P)
 . Robert Barnwell (P)
 . Daniel Huger (P)
 . Thomas Sumter (A)
 . Thomas Tudor Tucker (A)

Vermont 
 . Israel Smith (A), from October 31, 1791
 . Nathaniel Niles (A), from October 31, 1791

Virginia 
 . Alexander White (P)
 . John Brown (A), until June 1, 1792 (when his district became Kentucky)
 Vacant thereafter
 . Andrew Moore (A)
 . Richard Bland Lee (P)
 . James Madison (A)
 . Abraham B. Venable (A)
 . John Page (A)
 . Josiah Parker (P)
 . William B. Giles (A)
 . Samuel Griffin (A)

Membership changes
There were no political parties in this Congress. Members are informally grouped into factions of similar interest, based on an analysis of their voting record.

Vermont and Kentucky were newly admitted as states and are first represented in this Congress.

Senate
There were three resignations, one contested election, and four new seats of admitted states, resulting in a four-seat net gain of the Anti-Administration Senators.

|-
| Pennsylvania(1)
| Vacant
| Legislature failed to elect senator.Successor elected February 28, 1793.
|  | Albert Gallatin (A)
| December 2, 1793

|-
| Connecticut(3)
|  | William S. Johnson (P)
| Resigned March 4, 1791.Successor elected June 13, 1791.
|  | Roger Sherman (P)
| June 13, 1791

|-
| Vermont(3)
| rowspan=2 | New seat
| rowspan=2 | Vermont was admitted to the Union March 4, 1791.Winners elected October 17, 1791.
|  | Stephen R. Bradley (A)
| November 4, 1791

|-
| Vermont(1)
|  | Moses Robinson (A)
| November 4, 1791

|-
| Kentucky(3)
| rowspan=2 | New seat
| rowspan=2 | Kentucky was admitted to the Union June 1, 1792.Winners elected June 18, 1792.
|  | John Edwards (A)
| June 18, 1792

|-
| Kentucky(2)
|  | John Brown (A)
| June 18, 1792

|-
| Virginia(2)
|  | Richard Henry Lee (A)
| Resigned October 8, 1792.Successor elected October 18, 1792.
|  | John Taylor (A)
| October 18, 1792

|-
| Maryland(1)
|  | Charles Carroll (P)
| Resigned November 30, 1792.Successor elected January 10, 1793.
|  | Richard Potts (P)
| January 10, 1793

|}

House of Representatives
There were 3 resignations, 1 vacancy of a member-elect, 1 contested election, 2 late elections, and 4 new seats of admitted states, resulting in a 3-seat net gain of the Anti-Administration members and a 1-seat net gain of the Pro-Administration members.

|-
| nowrap | 
| Vacant
| Due to failure to reach a majority, four ballots were needed to elect.  Incumbent was elected late April 4, 1791.
|  | George Thatcher (P)
| April 4, 1791

|-
| nowrap | 
| Vacant
| Representative-elect James Townsend died on May 24, 1790, before Congress assembled.
|  | Thomas Tredwell (A)
| October 24, 1791

|-
| nowrap | 
| rowspan=2 | New seat
| rowspan=2 | Vermont was admitted to the Union on March 4, 1791.
|  | Israel Smith (A)
| October 24, 1791

|-
| nowrap | 
|  | Nathaniel Niles (A)
| October 24, 1791

|-
| nowrap | 
|  | William Pinkney (P)
| Resigned November 1791
|  | John Francis Mercer (A)
| February 6, 1792

|-
| nowrap | 
| Vacant
| Due to failure to reach a majority, eight ballots were needed to elect.  Incumbent was elected late April 2, 1792.
|  | George Leonard (P)
| April 2, 1792

|-
| nowrap | 
|  | John Brown (A)
| Resigned June 1, 1792, to become U.S. Senator from Kentucky.
| Vacant
| Seat went with Kentucky

|-
| nowrap | 
| rowspan=2 | New seat
| rowspan=2 | Kentucky was admitted to the Union on June 1, 1792.
|  | Alexander D. Orr (A)
| November 8, 1792

|-
| nowrap | 
|  | Christopher Greenup (A)
| November 9, 1792

|-
| nowrap | 
|  | Anthony Wayne (A)
| Anthony Wayne served until March 21, 1792, when seat declared vacant because the election was contested
|  | John Milledge (A)
| November 22, 1792

|-
| nowrap | 
|  | Joshua Seney (A)
| Resigned December 6, 1792.
|  | William Hindman (P)
| January 30, 1793

|}

Committees
Lists of committees and their party leaders.

Senate

 Whole

House of Representatives

 Elections (Chairman: Samuel Livermore)
 Rules (Select) 
 Whole

Joint committees

 Enrolled Bills (Chairman: John Rutherfurd)

Employees

Senate
Secretary: Samuel A. Otis
Doorkeeper: James Mathers 
Chaplain: William White (Episcopalian)

House of Representatives
Clerk: John Beckley
Sergeant at Arms: Joseph Wheaton 
Doorkeeper: Gifford Dalley 
Chaplain:
 Samuel Blair Presbyterian
 Ashbel Green, Presbyterian, elected November 5, 1792
 Reading Clerks:

See also 
 1790 United States elections (elections leading to this Congress)
 1790–91 United States Senate elections
 1790–91 United States House of Representatives elections
 1792 United States elections (elections during this Congress, leading to the next Congress)
 1792 United States presidential election
 1792–93 United States Senate elections
 1792–93 United States House of Representatives elections

Notes

References

External links
Statutes at Large, 1789–1875
Senate Journal, First Forty-three Sessions of Congress
House Journal, First Forty-three Sessions of Congress
Biographical Directory of the U.S. Congress
U.S. House of Representatives: House History
U.S. Senate: Statistics and Lists